Edakadathy is a village located near Mukkoottuthara in Erumely gram panchayat, Kottayam district, Kerala, India. It is situated near the border of Kottayam district and Pathanamthitta district, but officially recorded as a part of the former. It is located on the northern bank of Pamba River.

References

Villages in Kottayam district